Gothong Southern, formally Gothong Southern Shipping Lines Incorporated, is a shipping and cargo line based in Cebu City. The company was established by Bob Gothong in 2003 and is different from the original Carlos A. Gothong Lines, Inc. Gothong Southern provides containerized shipping in the Philippines, as well as specialized services for container and chassis repairs, integrated port services and shipping line activities. The company operates from out of seven major ports of call namely Manila, Cebu, Tacloban, Cagayan de Oro, Davao, General Santos and Ozamiz, with an additional 24 direct port links.

Vessels

Gothong Southern Shipping currently has 10 Cargo Vessels:
Don Carlos Sr.1
Don Alfonso Sr.2
Don Alfredo Sr.
Don Alberto Sr.
Don Albino Sr.
Don Carlos Sr. 2
Dona Caroline Joy
Don Charles Robert
Don Daxton

See also
Gothong Lines
Trans-Asia Shipping Lines
Cebu Ferries
Montenegro Lines
Roble Shipping Inc.
List of shipping companies in the Philippines

References

External links
Gothong Southern official website

Shipping companies of the Philippines
Companies based in Cebu City